Philomycus is a genus of air-breathing land slugs in the family Philomycidae, the mantleslugs.

Biology
These slugs create and use love darts as part of their mating behavior.

Species 
Species within the genus Philomycus include:
 Philomycus batchi -  dusky mantleslug 
 Philomycus bilineatus 
 Philomycus bisdosus - grayfoot mantleslug 
 Philomycus cardmensis 
 Philomycus carolinianus - Carolina mantleslug  
 Philomycus dorsalis  
 Philomycus flexuolaris - winding mantleslug  
 Philomycus pennsylvanicus 
 Philomycus sellatus - Alabama mantleslug  
 Philomycus togatus - toga mantleslug  
 Philomycus venustus - brown-spotted mantleslug  
 Philomycus virginicus - Virginia mantleslug

References

External links
 Philomycus. Integrated Taxonomic Information System (ITIS).

Philomycidae
Taxa named by Constantine Samuel Rafinesque